Didymodoxa is a genus of flowering plants belonging to the family Urticaceae.

Its native range is Eritrea to Southern Africa.

Species:

Didymodoxa caffra 
Didymodoxa capensis

References

Urticaceae
Urticaceae genera